Abdoul Madjid Boubacar Moumouni Soumana (born 10 May 1994) is a Nigerien professional footballer who plays for Iraqi Premier League club Al-Shorta and the Niger national football team.

International
He made his debut for the Niger national football team on 27 May 2018 in a friendly match against Central African Republic.

Honours

Club
AS SONIDEP
 Niger Cup: 2015
AS FAN
Niger Premier League: 2016, 2017
Al-Shorta
Iraqi Premier League: 2021–22
Iraqi Super Cup: 2022

References

External links
Abdoul Magid Moumouni at Footballdatabase
Abdoul Magid Moumouni at CAFonline.com

1994 births
Living people
Nigerien footballers
Niger international footballers
Association football midfielders
People from Niamey
AS FAN players
Al-Merrikh SC players
Al-Mina'a SC players
Al-Shorta SC players
Expatriate footballers in Sudan
Expatriate footballers in Iraq